Elvin Eksioglu (born September 13, 1966 in Istanbul, Turkey) is a Turkish film director, photographer, screenwriter, and film producer.

Early life and education
Eksioglu graduated from the Photography Department from Yıldız Technical University, and Cinema and Television Department, Fine Arts Faculty from Marmara University.

Career
Eksioglu has worked for Tempo, Aktüel, Cosmopolitan and Oto Haber magazines between 1989 - 1992. She opened her photography exhibition "Kizkulesi'ne Dokunmak" at Maiden's Tower in 1993. She founded news agency Agency Europe & Anatolia with Abdullah Eksioglu in November 1993. She founded Turkey-based international production company Eksantrik Production with Abdullah Eksioglu in 1998. Her book "Sevgiyle Butunlenen Yasam" was published in 1998. Elvin Eksioglu is currently fulfilling her duties as Commercials Director at Eksantrik Production and Editor in Chief at Agency Europe & Anatolia.

Filmography
 2011: FM 1992 (Documentary)
 2011: Suya Yazilan Tarih (Documentary)

References
 KameraArkasi
 FilmAdami
 Film.com.tr
 AntraktSinema
 Gazeteciler
 Kadinlar
 SinemaKusagi
 Sadibey.com
 Hurriyet Newspaper

External links
 
 

1966 births
Living people
Turkish women film directors
Turkish women film producers
Turkish female screenwriters
Turkish women photographers